"Don't Come Crying to Me" is a 1982 dance single written by Michael Gore/Dean Pitchford and performed by Linda Clifford. The single is from the album entitled, I'll Keep on Loving You.  Along with the track, "Let It Ride", "Don't Come Crying to Me" spent three weeks at number one on the US dance chart.  The track would be Clifford's final number one on the dance charts, and unlike her previous entries to the top spot, "Don't Come Crying To Me" did not cross over to any other chart.

References

1982 singles
Linda Clifford songs
Songs with music by Michael Gore
Songs written by Dean Pitchford
1982 songs
Capitol Records singles